Fernando Silva Bispo, better known as Fernando Holiday (born 22 September 1996) is a Brazilian politician affiliated to the Republicanos and councilor of the city of São Paulo. He was elected with 48,055 votes in the 2016 elections, and became the first openly gay councilor.

He was the national coordinator of the Free Brazil Movement (MBL) and a law student. Holiday became known for convening protests against the Dilma Rousseff government.

Political career

At the age of 20, Holiday was elected the youngest councilor in the history of São Paulo, with 48,055 votes.

When he ran for councilman, Holiday was supported by Senator Ronaldo Caiado (DEM-GO), noting that "Holiday has the capacity to represent Brazilians who hope to see renewed policy in it. The real interest in seeing the diminution of the privileges that are granted to politicians, as for example the high salaries and heavy benefits sustained by the voters, will be diminished, as Holiday already promised.

Political positions

In his first term as councilman, he undertook to donate 20 percent of his salary. Holiday also signed a term whereby he will agree to waive 50 percent of the current budget of the office, waive the use of the official car and driver and waive 50 percent of the money for operating expenses, going according to the popular demands of that austerity should be for everyone at a time of economic crisis.0

Holiday is opposed to the withdrawal of rights of blacks and LGBTs: "They should not have less rights, but should not have more rights." Holiday is against the policy of racial quotas in Brazil, considering that they encourage racism. "One of my proposals, not the main one, but one that I intend to propose over the next year, is the repeal of racial quotas in municipal public tenders. encouraging racism ... I believe it is a measure harmful to the state of São Paulo and harmful, even for the blacks themselves, "said Holiday.

In an interview with Brazil-Post, he said he was against invasions in schools. "Studying is a guaranteed right and it is not half a dozen students who do not even know what they are protesting against." Regarding PEC 241, he is in favor of the proposal and also in favor of the measure and of the social security and labor reforms defended by President Michel Temer. In this same interview, Holiday said that he will combat the victimhood, and said to be in favor of the 10 Measures against corruption, a bill of authorship of the Federal Public Ministry.

He has a liberal political position, and that all should be equal before the law, as the Brazilian Constitution says even if it admits to being a new figure of Brazilian Conservatism.

In December 2016 his public position was opposed to the increase of the salaries of the councilors of São Paulo, approved on 20 December by the own ones, a readjustment of 26.3%, in the middle of financial crisis. On 25 December, Judge Alberto Alonso Munoz through a preliminary injunction suspended the salary increase on the grounds that it violates the Fiscal Responsibility Law. The preliminary injunction was a popular action. In 2016, he gave an interview to the Brazil Parallel Congress, a group that in his documentaries, among others, explained Dilma Rousseff's impeachment.

Controversies

In 2018, politician Ciro Gomes called Fernando Holiday a "capitão do mato" (Bush captain, a Black hunter of runaway slaves; akin to Uncle Tom). In an interview with Rádio Jovem Pan, while presenting his political proposals, Ciro, without being asked about Fernando Holiday, said:

Holiday said on video that he wants to sue him. On 12 July 2018, a police investigation was opened to investigate the nature of the allegations. In 2019, Gomes was convicted and ordered to pay R$38,000 in moral damages.

Personal life

Holiday is a Roman Catholic convert from Evangelical Protestantism and due to his religious faith he abstains himself from relationships. He is a gay man. Holiday is against the practice of abortion and proposed a law to restrict it.

Alleged murder attempt

On 26 December 2018 there was a session in the City Hall of São Paulo in which Mr. Holiday voted for the approval of pension reform that negatively impacted tens of thousands of city workers. Holiday was the rapporteur of this project. The vote sparked protests. Moments after approval, Holiday alleged that he had suffered an attempted murder while in his office. On this day Holiday posted a photo on his Twitter account which showed a hole supposedly caused by a gunshot. The Civil Police investigated the case but found it inconclusive, due to lack of material evidence.

References

External links


1996 births
Afro-Brazilian people
Brazilian anti-communists
Brazilian politicians of African descent
Brazilian Roman Catholics
Conservatism in Brazil
Converts to Roman Catholicism from Evangelicalism
Democrats (Brazil) politicians
Gay politicians
LGBT Afro-Brazilians
LGBT conservatism
Brazilian gay men
Brazilian LGBT politicians
LGBT Roman Catholics
Living people
Patriota politicians
New Party (Brazil) politicians
Republicans (Brazil) politicians